Dong Thap Football Club, simply known as Dong Thap, is a Vietnamese football club based in Cao Lãnh, Đồng Tháp Province. Following the club's most recent relegation from the top-flight during the 2016 season, Đồng Tháp returned to the V.League 2 for the 2017 campaign. The team is currently playing at Cao Lãnh Stadium.

History

Dissolution and return
Following the 2014 V.League 2 season, the club's corporate sponsor announced that they would no longer fund the club. Not having enough resources to fund the club for their promotion to the 2015 V.League 1 season, the local sporting council decided to dissolve the club. However, a deal with Hong Quang Work Construction & Real Estate Investment Joint Stock Company helped save the club ahead of the 2015 season.

Stadium
Cao Lãnh Stadium is home stadium of Dong Thap FC, it's a multi-use stadium in Cao Lanh City, Dong Thap Province. It is currently used primarily for football matches. The stadium holds 23,000 people.

Kit suppliers and shirt sponsors

Honours

National competitions
League
V.League 1
Winners (2): 1989, 1996
Third place (1): 2010
V.League 2
Winners (2): 2006, 2014
Runners-up (1): 2002
Third place (1): 2008

Performance in AFC competitions
Asian Club Championship: 1 appearance
1997–98: Second round

Season-by-season record

Current squad
As of 14 August 2020

Current coaching staff

Managers
  Đoàn Minh Xương (1986–1999)
  Trần Công Minh (2003–04)
  Lại Hồng Vân (2006 – June 2007)
  Đoàn Minh Xương (June 2007 – Sept 07)
  Phạm Anh Tuấn (Oct 2007 – Jan 08)
  Phạm Công Lộc (Nov 2008 – Feb 11)
  Trang Văn Thành (Jan 2011 – Apr 12)
  Trần Công Minh (Apr 2012 – Apr 2013)
  Phạm Công Lộc (Apr 2013– Apr 2016)
  Trần Công Minh (May 2016– Jul 2019)
  Nguyễn Anh Tông (Jul 2019– )

References

External links
Dong Thap FC at Soccerway

Association football clubs established in 2009
Football clubs in Vietnam
2009 establishments in Vietnam
Dong Thap FC